Thomas Francis Fennell II (March 1, 1904 – May 23, 1991) was an American football player and boxer at Cornell University.  He was inducted into the Cornell Athletic Hall of Fame in 1989.

Life and sports career
Fennell was born on March 1, 1904, in Bronx, New York.  At Cornell, he lettered in football at left end in 1925 and won the university's heavyweight boxing championship as a freshman, junior and senior.  After obtaining his undergraduate degree from Cornell in 1926, he served as an assistant football coach under Gil Dobie from 1927 to 1931 while attending Cornell Law School, from which he earned an LLB in 1929.

An expert in labor arbitration, Fennell was first an associate and then a partner beginning in 1943 at Shearman & Sterling, a law firm in Manhattan. Fennell became of counsel to the firm in 1987. He was an innovator in arbitration and represented several private bus companies in New York City, as well as many other clients.

From 1972 to 1988, Fennell handled arbitration involving the Algerian National Oil Company and the construction of a pipeline by a consortium of French and Italian companies.  Other clients included Godfrey Stillman Rockefeller, grandson of William Rockefeller, and the Georgia-Pacific corporation.

Fennell died in 1991 in his Manhattan apartment of a cardiac arrest.  Fennell's uncle, Thomas Francis Fennell, 1896 Cornell graduate, is also a Cornell Athletic Hall of Famer.

References

External links
 Cornell Daily Sun, Volume XLVI, Issue 35, 31 October 1925. Page 1 - Thomas R. (sic) Fennell '26 - Left end ... will play his first game of the season today
 New York Times - September 29, 1925 - TWO CORNELL MEN OUT.; But Fennell and Isaly Are Expected Back in Line-Up Soon.
 New York Times - October 7, 1925 - CORNELL STARS STILL OUT.; Fennell, Wakeman, Isaly on Sidelines as Varsity Scrimmages
 New York Times - October 29, 1925 - DOBIE DRILLS HARD ON AN AIR DEFENSE; Anticipates Passing Attack From Columbia and Keeps Squad Late on Such Plays
 Mr. Shearman and Mr. Sterling and how They Grew, 1963, Yale University Press

1904 births
1991 deaths
American football ends
Cornell Big Red football coaches
Cornell Big Red football players
Cornell Law School alumni
Lawyers from New York City
Sportspeople from the Bronx
Players of American football from New York City
20th-century American lawyers
Boxers from New York City